Sverrir Stormsker (born 6 September 1963 in Reykjavík) is an Icelandic singer and pianist. He participated in the Eurovision Song Contest 1988, representing Iceland as half of the duo Beathoven along with Stefán Hilmarsson.  The song was entitled Þú og þeir (Sókrates).

References

1963 births
20th-century Icelandic male singers
Eurovision Song Contest entrants for Iceland
Eurovision Song Contest entrants of 1988
Living people
Icelandic pop singers